Maire Eva Johanna Gullichsen (née Ahlström, later known as Gullichsen-Nyströmer, 24 June 1907, Porin maalaiskunta – 9 July 1990, Pori) was a Finnish art collector and patron. She was a co-founder of the Artek furniture company. Pori Art Museum is based on Gullichsen's art collection.

Gullichsen was the daughter of Finnish businessman Walter Ahlström. Gullichsen's grandfather was Antti Ahlström, one of Finland's most influential and wealthiest 19th century businessman. She studied art in Helsinki and in Paris between 1925 and 1928 and got married in 1928 to Harry Gullichsen, a Finnish director of Norwegian descent working at the Ahlstrom company. Maire and Harry Gullichsen were supporters and keen lovers of modern art as well as applied arts and architecture.

In 1935 Gullichsen established the Free Art School, a private art school in Helsinki, where she also was a student. She was also one of the founders of Artek, along with architects Alvar and Aino Aalto and art historian Nils-Gustav Hahl. One of Alvar Aalto's most important works is Villa Mairea in Noormarkku, designed for Harry and Maire Gullichsen in 1938. Today it is one of the internationally best-known architectural sights in Finland. One of the key rooms of the house is Maire Gullichsen's private painting studio on the upper floor, with a view over the main approach to the house. During her late years Gullichsen was intent on establishing an art museum in Pori. It was finally inaugurated in 1979.

Family 
Maire and Harry Gullichsen (1902–1954) had four children. The eldest, Harriet (born 1929), died young, Kristian Gullichsen (1932–2021) was a well-known architect, Johan Gullichsen (born 1936) is a professor and a former Olympic sailor, and Lilli Alanen (1941–2021) was a philosopher and professor emeritus at Uppsala University, Sweden.  Maire Gullichsen married Captain Bertil C. Nyströmer in 1969. Maire Gullichsen was also the grandmother of painter and sculptor Alvar Gullichsen.

See also 
Ahlström–Gullichsen family

References 

1907 births
1990 deaths
People from Pori
People from Turku and Pori Province (Grand Duchy of Finland)
Finnish art collectors
Finnish patrons of the arts